Tazehabad-e Amin may refer to:
 Tazehabad-e Amin, Kermanshah
 Tazehabad-e Amin, Kurdistan